Proletarian Catalan Party was a political party in Catalonia, Spain. PCP was founded in January 1934. Its main leader was Jaume Compte. PCP had its origins in the Estat Català-Partit Proletari, founded in 1932.

The goal of PCP was the creation of a Catalan Socialist Republic.

The party had a large influence with the trade union Centre Autonomista de Dependents de Comerç i Industria (CADCI). In 1936 Peres Aznar, a PCP deputy in the Cortes, was elected president of CADCI.

The party had around 500–800 members at its peak, mainly from Barcelona. PCP published Catalunya Insurgent. Its youth wing was known as Joventuts del Partit Català Proletari.

In 1936 PCP merged with other groups to form the Unified Socialist Party of Catalonia.

References

Defunct communist parties in Catalonia
Catalan nationalist parties
Political parties established in 1934
1934 establishments in Spain
Political parties disestablished in 1936
Left-wing nationalist parties
1936 disestablishments in Spain